Medzilaborce District (okres Medzilaborce) is a district in
the Prešov Region of northeastern Slovakia. It is the least populated of Slovakia's 79 districts. Until 1918, the district was part of the county of Kingdom of Hungary of Zemplín.

Economy and infrastructure
Mainly glass and machinery industry have the largest tradition in small town Medzilaborce.

From 1970s it had been a branch of Jablonecke sklarne which had employ approximately 600 people in the glass industry. Since 1999 Glass LPS has been a follower of 45 years old tradition in glass industry in Medzilaborce and still manufacture crystal chandeliers, grind crystal trimmings and export them around the world.

It was Transporta, later Vihorlat which had 1200 employees in machinery industry in small town Medzilaborce. Privatization and global financial crises had destroyed the structure of the whole factory. 
Nowadays companies Kovostroj and Labstroj continue in machinery industry.

Major employers

Glass LPS Ltd.
Kovostroj Inc.
Labstroj Ltd.

Municipalities

Source

References 

Districts of Slovakia
Geography of Prešov Region